The Judicature Act (the Act) provides for the structure of the Supreme Court and Appeal Court of the Canadian province of Nova Scotia. It is contained in Chapter 240 of the Revised Statutes of Nova Scotia.

First enacted by the Nova Scotia legislature in 1884, the Act governs civil procedures rules in the province.

Revisions were made in:

 1886
 1992
 1996
 1997
 1998
 2000
 2003

References
 Judicature Act updated to 2007-08-13
 Civil Procedures Nova Scotia

Political history of Nova Scotia
Nova Scotia provincial legislation
1884 in Canadian law
19th century in Nova Scotia
1884 in Nova Scotia